INS Tarkash (F50) is the second  constructed for the Indian Navy. She is part of the second batch of Talwar-class frigates ordered by the Indian Navy. She was built at the Yantar shipyard in Kaliningrad, Russia. She was commissioned to Navy service on 9 November 2012 at Kaliningrad and joined the Western Naval Command on 27 December 2012.

Design

Tarkash belongs to the second flight (F45, F50, F51) of Talwar class of guided missile frigates. These are modified Krivak III-class frigates built by Russia. These ships use stealth technologies and a special hull design to ensure a reduced radar cross section. Much of the equipment on the ship is Russian-made, but a significant number of systems of Indian origin have also been incorporated. The main difference between Tarkash and the earlier flight of Talwar-class ships (F40, F43, F44) is the use of BrahMos missiles in place of the Klub-N missiles in the earlier ships. It is the second of the three frigates built in Russia as a follow-up order to the first batch of Talwar-class frigates.

Construction

Tarkash was launched on 23 June 2010 at Yantar Shipyard in Kaliningrad, Russia. Her delivery was delayed from the original goal of October 2011 due to labour shortages and delays in equipment deliveries. She departed the Yantar shipyard on 24 May 2012 to begin her sea trials. The sea trials were successfully completed in the month of August 2012.

On 9 November 2012, Tarkash was handed over to the Indian Navy by Yantar Shipyard. She joined the Western Naval Command on 27 December 2012.

Operations

Operation Raahat

Gallery

References

External links

Talwar-class frigates
Frigates of the Indian Navy
2010 ships